The Kharol are a Hindu caste found in the state of Rajasthan in India.

History and origin

The Kharol community is historically associated with the occupation of salt making and agriculture. In the local language, Rajasthani, the word khar means salt, and kandera means someone who works with cotton. Like many groups in Rajasthan, they claim Rajput ancestry and they are a Rajput. They are said to have migrated from Delhi, Madhya Pradesh, Gujarat, Maharashtra to Rajasthan. Some ancestor belong to Marwari region. The community generally speak the Mewari dialect.

Present circumstances

The community are divided into two endogamous divisions, namely the Rajputs and Todwala. These two divisions are sub-divided into gotras, and they maintain gotra exogamy. The Kharol are no longer involved in their traditional occupation of manufacturing salt, and are mainly involved in agriculture, being landless labourers.

References

Social groups of Rajasthan
Indian castes